Six P.M. is the 1946 American release title of the 1944 Soviet film At 6 P.M. After the War ((also At six o'clock in the evening after the war) by Ivan Pyryev.

Plot
In the very beginning of the Great Patriotic War, a young artillery officer Pavel (Ivan Lyubeznov)  receives a package from an orphanage. In a leave, his comrade an he go to the orphanage to see the children who sent it. Pavel meets there a young woman Varia (Marina Ladynina). They fall in love from the first sight. They agree to meet again in Moscow "in 6 p.m. after the War'. Varia joins the army and becomes an anti-aircraft gunner. Varia and Pavel meet again after the War.

The title
The Russian film title alludes to the agreement of the Good Soldier Švejk and sapper Vodička on their way to the front, to meet at the pub "By the Chalice" (U Kalicha) "at 6 p.m. after the war". In the film, the two young lovers agree to meet at 6 p.m. after the war at the Bolshoy Kamenny Bridge in Moscow. Since then the expression has become a Russian catch phrase.

Another version connects the title with a poem written by the Soviet poet Yevgeniy Dolmatovsky during the Winter war with Finland in 1940. The poem entitled merely '6 P.M." has the line "at 6 P.M. after the War" as the refrain.

Facts about the Movie 

 The movie predicted that the War would end in May.
 The film earned the 1946 Stalin Prize of 2nd degree for the director, the composer Tikhon Khrennikov, screenwriter Viktor Gusev, and lead actors Marina Ladynina, Ivan Lyubeznov, and Yevgeny Samoylov.

Cast
Marina Ladynina - Varia Pankova
Ivan Lyubeznov - Lieutenant Pavel Demidov
Yevgeny Samoylov - senior lieutenant Vasily Kudryashov
Ariadne Lisak - Fenya, Varia's friend
Elena Savitskaya - Aunt Katya, building manager
Yevgeny Morgunov - artilleryman
Mikhail Pugovkin - artilleryman
Tatyana Barysheva - resident of house number 5
Irina Murzaeva - pianist
Lyudmila Semyonova - anti-aircraft gunner
Aleksandr Antonov - commander
Margarita Zharov - collective farm girl (uncredited)
Alexandra Danilova - anti-aircraft gunner (uncredited)
Stepan Krylov - military (uncredited)
Tatiana Govorkov - neighbor (uncredited)

References

1940s musical drama films
Soviet musical drama films
1940s romantic musical films
Soviet romantic drama films
Mosfilm films
Russian romantic drama films
Soviet black-and-white films
1944 drama films
1944 films
Russian black-and-white films
Films scored by Tikhon Khrennikov